Querétaro Fútbol Club Premier was a professional football team that played in the Mexican Football League. They were playing in the Liga Premier (Mexico's Third Division). Querétaro Fútbol Club Premier was affiliated with Querétaro F.C. who plays in the Liga MX. The games were held in the city of Santiago de Querétaro in the CEGAR.

Players

Current squad

References

Querétaro F.C.
Football clubs in Querétaro
2015 establishments in Mexico
Liga Premier de México